Georgios Vaitsis (born 1 August 1967) is a Greek former professional footballer. A powerful forward, he is mostly remembered for his headers and his shooting skills. Vaitsis played for Anagennisi Artas, Panachaiki and Olympiacos.

Statistics
Vaitsis had 139 First Division appearances for Panachaiki and scored 29 goals. He had one cap for the Greece national team.

His most celebrated and remembered goal was in the second round of the 1992–93 European Cup Winners Cup, when he scored the winner for Olympiacos Piraeus FC with a header, against AS Monaco in France.

References
 
 

1967 births
Living people
Greek footballers
Footballers from Arta, Greece
Association football forwards
Greece international footballers
Super League Greece players
Panachaiki F.C. players
Olympiacos F.C. players
Ethnikos Piraeus F.C. players